Calycobathra variapenella is a moth in the family Cosmopterigidae. It is found in Turkey, the northern Caucasus, Transcaucasia and Central Asia.

The wingspan is 10–11 mm. Adults are on wing from May to July.

References

Moths described in 1984
Chrysopeleiinae